Ilija (Cyrillic script: Илија) is a South Slavic male given name, cognate of Ilya/Elijah.

It may refer to:
 Ilija (kefalija), Serbian nobleman of the 14th century
 Ilija Aračić, Croatian football player
 Ilija Arnautović, Slovene architect of Serbian origin
 Ilija Babalj, Bosnian Australian football player
 Ilija Bašičević, Serbian painter
 Ilija Batljan, Montenegrin Swedish politician
 Ilija Birčanin, Serbian nobleman
 Ilija Bozoljac, Serbian tennis player
 Ilija Crijević, Dubrovnik poet
 Ilija Čarapić, Serbian politician
 Ilija Dimovski, Macedonian politician
 Ilija Đukić, Serbian diplomat
 Ilija Garašanin, Serbian politician
 Ilija Gregorić, Croatian soldier
 Ilija Grgic, Croatian Australian football player
 Ilija Ivezić, Croatian actor
 Ilija Ivić, Serbian football player
 Ilija Janković, Serbian soldier
 Ilija Katić, Serbian football player
 Ilija Lupulesku, Serbian American table tennis player
 Ilija Lončarević, Croatian football coach
 Ilija Lukić, Serbian football player
 Ilija Milošević, Italian astronomer
 Ilija Mitić, Serbian American football player
 Ilija Monte Radlovic, Montenegrin British soldier and writer
 Ilija Najdoski, Macedonian football player
 Ilija Nestorovski, Macedonian football player
 Ilija Ničić, Serbian sport shooter
 Ilija Okrugić, Croatian writer
 Ilija Panajotović, Serbian film producer and tennis player
 Ilija Pantelić, Serbian football player
 Ilija Pejovski, Macedonian classical musician
 Ilija Perajica, outlaw from Dalmatia
 Ilija Petković, Serbian football player
 Ilija Prodanović, Bosnian football player
 Ilija Radović, Montenegrin football player
 Ilija Ristanić, Bosnian football player
 Ilija Sivonjić, Croatian football player
 Ilija Spasojević, Montenegrin Indonesian footballer
 Ilija Stanić, Bosnian secret agent
 Ilija Stolica, Serbian football player
 Ilija Temelkovski, Macedonian handball coach
 Ilija Trifunović-Birčanin, Serbian soldier
 Ilija Trojanow, Bulgarian writer
 Ilija Zavišić, Serbian football player

See also
Ilya, given name
Ilia, given name
Ilja, given name
Ilić, surname
Ilijić, surname

Croatian masculine given names
Bulgarian masculine given names
Serbian masculine given names
Montenegrin masculine given names
Macedonian masculine given names

de:Ilija
sr:Илија